, better known by his stage name , is a Japanese voice actor from Kumejima, Okinawa. He is affiliated with Mausu Promotion. His most notable roles include Kariya Matou in Fate/Zero, Eishirō Kite in The Prince of Tennis II, Togusa in Ghost in the Shell: Arise, Lemillion in My Hero Academia, Yashiro in Twittering Birds Never Fly: The Clouds Gather, and Yugo Kakitani in Vivy: Fluorite Eye's Song.

Filmography

Television animation

Theatrical animation

Original video animation

{| class="wikitable sortable plainrowheaders"
|+ List of voice performances in original video animations (OVAs)
! scope="col" | Year
! scope="col" | Title
! scope="col" | Role
! scope="col" class="unsortable" | Notes
! scope="col" class="unsortable" | Source
|-
! scope="row" rowspan="1" | 2006
| The Prince of Tennis: National Tournament Arc || Eishirō Kite || || 
|-
! scope="row" rowspan="1" | 2013–15
| Ghost in the Shell: Arise || Togusa || || 
|-
! scope="row" rowspan="1" | 2020
| Pokémon: Twilight Wings || Milo || 
|-
! scope="row" rowspan="1" | 2021
| Twittering Birds Never Fly: Don't Stay Gold || Yashiro || || 
|-
|}

Audio dramas

Dubbing
Live-actionBack to the Future (2014 BS Japan edition) (Biff Tannen (Thomas F. Wilson))Back to the Future Part II (2018 BS Japan edition) (Biff Tannen / Griff Tannen / Gertrude Tannen (Thomas F. Wilson))Back to the Future Part III (2018 BS Japan edition) (Buford "Mad Dog" Tannen (Thomas F. Wilson))Bel Ami (David Choi (Lee Jang-woo))Blue Story (Killy / Kiron (Khali Best))The Butler (2016 BS Japan edition) (Louis Gaines (David Oyelowo))Hawaii Five-0 (Chin Ho Kelly (Daniel Dae Kim))The Hundred-Foot Journey (Hassan Kadam (Manish Dayal))The Physician (Rob Cole (Tom Payne))Piranha 3DD (Kyle (Chris Zylka))Testament of Youth (Roland Leighton (Kit Harington))War Horse (Albert Narracott (Jeremy Irvine))Welcome to the Jungle (Chris (Adam Brody))Zack Snyder's Justice League (Ryan Choi (Zheng Kai))Yo soy Betty, la fea (Armando Mendoza (Jorge Enrique Abello))

AnimationTrolls World Tour'' (Biggie)

References

External links
 Official agency profile 
 
 
  

1976 births
Living people
Japanese male video game actors
Japanese male voice actors
Male voice actors from Okinawa Prefecture